Maszewo  (formerly ) is a town in Goleniów County, West Pomeranian Voivodeship, Poland, with 3,062 inhabitants (2004).

See also
History of Pomerania

External links
 Official town webpage

Cities and towns in West Pomeranian Voivodeship
Goleniów County